The 1874 Monmouthshire by-election was fought on 17 March 1874.  The byelection was fought due to the incumbent Conservative MP, Lord Henry Somerset, becoming Comptroller of the Household.  It was retained by the incumbent.

Results

References

1874 elections in the United Kingdom
1874 in Wales
1870s elections in Wales
19th century in Monmouthshire
March 1874 events
Elections in Monmouthshire
By-elections to the Parliament of the United Kingdom in Welsh constituencies
Unopposed ministerial by-elections to the Parliament of the United Kingdom in Welsh constituencies